The fourth and final season of the American television comedy-drama series Devious Maids was ordered on September 24, 2015. Filming began January 14, 2016, with episode titles being cleaning puns. It consisted of 10 episodes, airing from June 6 through August 8, 2016.

Plot
This season, Marisol finds herself acting as a support system to Evelyn (Rebecca Wisocky) in the wake of a big life change. Meanwhile, Rosie's positive and sunny disposition leaves much to be desired by her new boss, Genevieve (Susan Lucci) who is acclimating to a household without Zoila's honest and acerbic humor. Carmen continues to pursue her singing career until her cousin's daughter, Daniela (Sol Rodriguez) comes to town and shakes things up. Marisol also finds herself in a new relationship, which eventually becomes a complicated triangle when her old flame Jesse. Adrian tries to punish Evelyn for leaving him

Production
Devious Maids was renewed for a fourth season on September 24, 2015, which would have 10 episodes unlike previous seasons which consisted of 13 episodes. Episode titles of this season are cleaning puns. For the fourth season, series regulars Brianna Brown (Taylor Stappord), Brett Cullen (Michael Stappord) and Gilles Marini (Sebastien Dussault) are demoted, and will not appear in the season. It was announced on Twitter that Mariana Klaveno will return as Peri Westmore for the fourth season. Deadline announced on January 12, 2016, that Eva Longoria would be making an appearance as herself in the season premiere. It was also announced that James Denton was cast for the show as Peter, the charming confident head of a movie studio who falls hard and fast into a new relationship this season. Sol Rodriguez was added as a series regular, playing Carmen's cousin Daniela, and Nathan Owens was to return as series regular.

Ryan McPartlin was announced on January 20, 2016, to be cast as Kyle, a sweet, fun, and impossibly sexy new neighbor. TheWrap reported that Julie Claire will return as Gail Flemming for the fourth season. TVLine reported on February 3, 2016, that Carlos Ponce had been added to the show as Ben, a "handsome and slick" manager of a major movie star. Scott Takeda announced himself on Twitter that he would be appearing in the fourth season of Devious Maids as Dr. Brooks.

Cast

Main
 Ana Ortiz as Marisol Suarez 
 Dania Ramirez as Rosie Westmore/Falta
 Roselyn Sánchez as Carmen Luna 
 Judy Reyes as Zoila Diaz 
 Rebecca Wisocky as Evelyn Powell 
 Tom Irwin as Adrian Powell 
 Susan Lucci as Genevieve Delatour 
 Grant Show as Spence Westmore 
 Nathan Owens as Jesse Morgan
 Sol Rodriguez as Daniela Mercado

Recurring
 Ryan McPartlin as Kyle
 James Denton as Peter Hudson
 Carlos Ponce as Benjamin "Ben" Pacheco
 Stephanie Faracy as Frances
 Carter Birchwell as Tucker Westmore
 Julie Claire as Gail Flemming
 Owen Harn as Stuart "Kill Face" Pearlman
 Katherine LaNasa as Shannon Greene
 Sam McMurray as Hugh Metzger
 Sean Blakemore as Reverend James Hamilton
 Alejandro Vera as Miguel Falta
 Christopher Hanke as Fabian
 April Parker Jones as Detective Shaw
 Kate Beahan as Fiona Gladhart

Guest
 Mariana Klaveno as Peri Westmore
 Elizabeth Rodriguez as Josefina Mercado
 Deke Anderson as Rick Dresden
 Sharon Lawrence as Lori
 Scott Takeda as Dr. Brooks
 Eva Longoria as herself

Episodes

Ratings

U.S. ratings

References

External links
 
 
 
 

Devious Maids
2016 American television seasons